John Edwin Haire, Baron Haire of Whiteabbey (30 October 1908 – 7 October 1966) was a British Labour Party politician.

Born in the region of Portadown, County Armagh, Ireland he was the son of John Haire and Mary Tedford. In the 1911 Irish Census the Haire family are documented as residing at 4 Century Street, Portadown.  They were of Church of Ireland stock.

Haire graduated from Queen's University, Belfast in 1931 with a Batchelor of Arts (BA) and a Diploma in Education (DipEd). In 1936 he was awarded a Master of Arts (MA). He married Dr. Susanne Elizabeth Kemeny on 30 June 1939.

He fought in the Second World War in the RAF gaining the rank of Squadron Leader.

At the 1945 general election, he was elected as Member of Parliament for Wycombe.  He held the seat at the 1950 general election, but at the 1951 general election he was defeated by the Conservative candidate William Astor. At the by-election the following year, after Astor succeeded to a peerage, he contested the seat again but was again defeated. In his final try for Parliament, in 1955, he narrowly lost the new seat of Eastleigh to the Conservatives.

On 13 May 1965 he was made a life peer with the title Baron Haire of Whiteabbey, of Newtownabbey in the County of Antrim.  Whiteabbey was one of seven villages that were merged to form Newtownabbey in Northern Ireland when the town was created on 1 April 1958.

While lecturing on comparative politics at Rutgers University, he suffered a stroke in a downtown New Brunswick, New Jersey bus station, later dying in a local hospital. He was a resident of Chelsea.

References

External links 
 

Haire, John Edwin, Baron Haire
Haire, John Edwin, Baron Haire
Alumni of Queen's University Belfast
Haire, John Edwin
Haire of Whiteabbey
Royal Air Force personnel of World War II
Haire, John Edwin
Haire, John Edwin
UK MPs who were granted peerages
Life peers created by Elizabeth II